is an autobahn in southwestern Germany. It connects the Mainz area to Kaiserslautern and the A 6 and is therefore an important connection between the Rhine/Main and the Saar areas.  It was constructed during the 1980/90s and finished in : last section Sembach to Kaiserslautern.

Historically an uninterrupted Autobahn, one final  section was added between Sembach and Kaiserslautern at the current site of the Dreieck Kaiserslautern/KL-Zentrum Ausfahrt. This relieved the heavy traffic on the two lane Bundesstraße 40.

Exit list 

, connection to 

 

|}

External links 

63
A063
Transport in Mainz
North Palatinate